Ann Wright is an American colonel.

Ann(e) Wright may also refer to:

Anne St. Clair Wright, American preservationist
Anne Wright-Grassham; see Minna Bluff
Anne Wright (or Albright); see List of Protestant martyrs of the English Reformation

See also
Mary Ann Wright (disambiguation)
Wright (surname)